Rudolf Brinkmann (29 December 1873 – 3 November 1927) was a German operatic baritone.

Life 
Brinkmann was born in Elberfeld (today a district of Wuppertal), the son of a pastry shop owner. At the age of 16 he began his training at the Cologne Opera and Drama School with Paul Hoppe. After he was also taught by him in Hamburg, he went to Heilbronn in 1895 and then to the German Opera in Amsterdam, which soon disbanded. In 1897 he was engaged at the Oper Frankfurt and worked there until his early death in 1927.
Allegedly he sang an almost unbelievable number of parts (between 300 and 500).

Brinkmann, who was attached to the ideas of Freemasonry, was married with the opera soubrette Minnie Rau. He died at the age of 54 in Frankfurt.

Further reading 
 Ludwig Eisenberg: Rudolf Brinkmann. In Großes biographisches Lexikon der deutschen Bühne im XIX. Jahrhundert.<ref>Rudolf Brinkmann in Großes biographisches Lexikon der deutschen Bühne im XIX. Jahrhundert] in  Paul List publishing house, Leipzig 1903, </ref>
 Wilhelm Kosch: Deutsches Theater-Lexikon''. Biographisches und bibliographisches Handbuch. First volume. Klagenfurt / Vienna 1953,

External links 

References 

German operatic baritones
20th-century German male opera singers
1873 births
1927 deaths
People from Elberfeld
Musicians from Wuppertal